The 1939–40 Indiana Hoosiers men's basketball team represented Indiana University. Their head coach was Branch McCracken, who was in his 2nd year. The team played its home games in The Fieldhouse in Bloomington, Indiana, and was a member of the Big Ten Conference.

The Hoosiers finished the regular season with an overall record of 20–3 and a conference record of 9–3, finishing 2nd in the Big Ten Conference to the Purdue Boilermakers. Purdue was invited to participate in the 8-team NCAA tournament, but declined their bid recommending IU play in the tournament in their place. In only the second national tournament, IU won their first NCAA Tournament Championship by defeating Kansas, 60–42, in the final. Indiana was also retroactively recognized as the national champion by the Premo-Porretta Power Poll.

Roster

Schedule/Results

|-
!colspan=8| Regular Season
|-

|-
!colspan=8| NCAA tournament

Awards and honors
 Marv Huffman, Consensus second team All-American
 Marv Huffman, NCAA basketball tournament Most Outstanding Player
 Bill Menke, Third team All-American (Converse)

References

Indiana
Indiana Hoosiers men's basketball seasons
NCAA Division I men's basketball tournament championship seasons
NCAA Division I men's basketball tournament Final Four seasons
Indiana
Indiana Hoosiers men's basketball team
Indiana Hoosiers men's basketball team